Hunter's Moon is the third studio album by the noise rock band Of Cabbages and Kings. It was released in 1992 on Triple X Records.

Track listing

Personnel 
Adapted from the Hunter's Moon liner notes.

Of Cabbages and Kings
 Algis Kizys – bass guitar, vocals (3, 8), production
 Carolyn Master – guitar, vocals (4, 7, 8), production
 Vincent Signorelli – drums, vocals (7)
 Diane Wlezien – vocals (2, 4-8)
Additional musicians
 Eric Hubel – guitar (8)
 David Ouimet – keyboards (6)
 Ted Parsons – drums (8)
 J. G. Thirlwell – vocals (1)

Technical personnel
 Barry Diament – mastering
 Sandra Hamburg – photography
 Wharton Tiers – production, engineering

Release history

References

External links 
 

1992 albums
Of Cabbages and Kings albums
Albums produced by Wharton Tiers
Triple X Records albums